Neubrunn is a municipality in the district of Würzburg in Lower Franconia, Bavaria, Germany.

It consists of the districts Böttigheim and Neubrunn.

References

Würzburg (district)